Pius Hollenstein (born 3 November 1907, date of death unknown) was an Austrian gymnast. He competed in eight events at the 1936 Summer Olympics.

References

1907 births
Year of death missing
Austrian male artistic gymnasts
Olympic gymnasts of Austria
Gymnasts at the 1936 Summer Olympics
Place of birth missing
20th-century Austrian people